Alfonso Luna Islas (born 23 January 1990) is a Mexican professional footballer who plays as a defender for Venados.

External links
 
Alfonso Luna at Soccerway

Liga MX players
Living people
Atlante F.C. footballers
1990 births
Mexican footballers
People from Metepec (México)
Association football defenders